On Stage is a live recording of four songs performed on Kate Bush's Tour of Life in 1979. It was released on 31 August 1979 and peaked at number 10 on the UK chart.

Background 

On Stage was recorded live at the Hammersmith Odeon on 13 May 1979. It became Bush's first official (non-bootlegged) live performance on vinyl. The EP was the only audio (non-bootleg) recording of Kate Bush live for years, until 1994 when 60 minutes of the concert was released on Audio CD. Although the recordings are purportedly all from the same date, the four tracks on this EP are quite different from those of the later release.

The record was released on 12" vinyl and cassette in many countries, while in the UK EMI chose to initially release it as two 7" vinyl records packaged in a cardboard gatefold sleeve, this edition quickly superseded by a single disc version, which crammed all 4 tracks onto one 7" vinyl record, with a 33RPM speed rather than 45RPM. The single was packaged in a gatefold sleeve.

The EP's peak at #10 gave Bush her third UK top 10 hit. Studio versions of all four songs were originally released on her first two albums; "Them Heavy People", "James and the Cold Gun" and "L'Amour Looks Something Like You" from The Kick Inside (1978) and "Don't Push Your Foot on the Heartbrake" from Lionheart (1978).

Charts

Track listing

 7": EMI / EMI MIEP 2991 (UK)

References 

Kate Bush albums
1979 debut EPs
Live EPs
1979 live albums
Albums recorded at the Hammersmith Apollo
Live art rock albums
Art rock EPs